Nazarabad (also Romanized as Naz̧arābād and Nazrābād; also known as Nazarābāe) is a village in Shurjeh Rural District, in the Central District of Sarvestan County, Fars Province, Iran. At the 2006 census, its population was 1,065, in 246 families.

References 

Populated places in Sarvestan County